Papilio sakontala is a species of swallowtail butterfly from the genus Papilio that is found in India.

Taxonomy
The taxonomic rank of Papilio sakontala is uncertain. It is a member of the fuscus species-group. The members of this clade are
 Papilio albinus Wallace, 1865
 Papilio diophantus Grose-Smith, 1883
 Papilio fuscus Goeze, 1779 
 Papilio hipponous C. & R. Felder, 1862
 Papilio jordani Fruhstorfer, 1906
 Papilio pitmani Elwes & de Nicéville, [1887]
 Papilio prexaspes C. & R. Felder, 1865 
 Papilio sakontala Hewitson, 1864

References

External links
The Global Butterfly Information System Images of holotype deposited in the Natural History Museum, London. Taxonomic history.

sakontala
Butterflies described in 1864
Butterflies of Asia
Taxa named by William Chapman Hewitson